Koznica may refer to:
 Koznica, a mountain in Kosovo
 Koznica (Aleksandrovac), a village in Serbia
 Koznica, Vladičin Han, a village in Serbia

See also 
 Koznitsa (disambiguation)